Dorothy Louise Surgenor (born November 5, 1931) is an American alpine skier. She competed in two events at the 1956 Winter Olympics.

References

External links
 
 Dorothy Louise Surgenor at Olympics.com

1931 births
Living people
American female alpine skiers
Olympic alpine skiers of the United States
Alpine skiers at the 1956 Winter Olympics
Skiers from Seattle
21st-century American women